Hobo's Lullaby is an album by the American folk singer Arlo Guthrie. It was released in 1972 on Reprise Records. It was re-released on Rising Son Records in 1997. The album contains Guthrie's only Top 40 hit, a cover of Steve Goodman's "City of New Orleans".

Track listing

Personnel
 Arlo Guthrie – vocals, guitar
 Hoyt Axton – vocals
 Max Bennett – bass
 Byron Berline – mandolin, fiddle
 Roger Bush – bass
 Cozy Cole – drums
 Ry Cooder – guitar
 John Craviotto – drums
 Nick DeCaro – vocals, accordion on "City of New Orleans"
 Jim Dickinson – keyboards
 Doug Dillard – banjo
 Chris Ethridge – bass
 Wilton Felder – tenor saxophone
 Venetta Fields – vocals
 Anne Goodman – cello
 Gib Guilbeau – fiddle
 Richie Hayward – drums
 Jim Keltner – drums
 Clydie King – vocals
 Bill Lee – bass
 Thad Maxwell – guitar
 Gene Merlino – vocals
 Arnie Moore – bass
 Gimmer Nicholson – guitar
 Spooner Oldham – keyboards
 Thurl Ravenscroft – vocals
 Fritz Richmond – bass
 Linda Ronstadt – vocals
 Jessica Smith – vocals
 Clarence White – guitar

Production 
Lenny Waronker, John Pilla - producer
Donn Landee - engineer
John Pilla - photography

References

Arlo Guthrie albums
1972 albums
Albums produced by Lenny Waronker
Rising Son Records albums
Reprise Records albums